Acre is a state located in the west of the North Region of Brazil and the Amazonia Legal. Located in the westernmost part of the country, at a two-hour time difference from Brasília, Acre is bordered clockwise by the Brazilian states of Amazonas and Rondônia to the north and east, the Bolivian department of Pando to the southeast, and the Peruvian regions of Madre de Dios, Ucayali and Loreto to the south and west. The state, which has 0.42% of the Brazilian population, generates 0.2% of the Brazilian GDP.

Its capital and largest city is Rio Branco. Other important places include Cruzeiro do Sul, Sena Madureira, Tarauacá and Feijó.

Intense extractive activity in the rubber industry, which reached its height in the early 20th century, attracted Brazilians from many regions to the state. From the mixture of sulista, southeastern Brazil, nordestino, and indigenous traditions arose a diverse cuisine. It combines sun-dried meat (carne-de-sol) with pirarucu, a typical fish of the region. Such dishes are seasoned with tucupi, a sauce made from manioc.

Fluvial transport, concentrated on the Juruá and Moa rivers, in the western part of the state, and the Tarauacá and Envira rivers in the northwest, is the principal form of transportation, especially between November and June. Heavy seasonal rains frequently make the BR-364 impassable in those months; it usually connects Rio Branco to Cruzeiro do Sul.

Etymology
The name, which was given to the territory in 1904, is derived from one of the local rivers, and to the state in 1962, perhaps originates from the Tupi word a'kir ü "green river", or from the form a'kir, of the Tupi word ker, "to sleep, to rest". It is believed more likely to be derived from Aquiri, a transliteration by European explorers of the term Umákürü, or Uakiry, from the Ipurinã dialect. Another hypothesis is that Acquiri derives from Yasi'ri, or Ysi'ri, meaning "flowing or swift water".

According to one account, agriculturist João Gabriel de Carvalho Melo wrote during an 1878 trip on the Purús River to merchant Viscount of Santo Elias (from Pará), asking him for goods to be sent to the "mouth of the Aquiri River". In Belém, the local merchant or his employees either misinterpreted Gabriel's handwriting, or he spelled the name wrong: the goods and invoice which Gabriel received were marked as having been sent to the Acre River.

Acre possesses some nicknames: the End of Brazil, The Rubber Tree State, the Latex State (from when it was a center of rubber production) and the Western End.

The native inhabitants of Acre are called acrianos, in the singular acriano. Until the entry according to the Orthographic Agreement of 1990, the correct spelling was acreano in the singular and in the plural acreanos. In 2009, with the new orthographic agreement, the change generated controversy between the Academy of Letters of Acre (Academia Acreana de Letras) and the Brazilian Academy of Letters (Academia Brasileira de Letras). The latter said that the change would mean the denial of the state's historical and cultural roots, by changing the last letter of the toponym from "E" to "I".

Geography

It is located at 70º west longitude and at 9º south latitude. In Brazil, the state is part of the North Region, forming borders with the states of Amazonas and Rondônia, and with two countries: Peru and Bolivia.

Practically all of the terrain of the state of Acre is part of the low sandstone plateau, or terra firme, morphological unit which dominates most of the Brazilian Amazon. These terranes rise, in Acre, from the southeast to the northeast, with very tabular topography in general. In the extreme west is found the Serra da Contamana or Serra do Divisor, along the western border, with the highest altitudes in the state.

The Amazon Rainforest covers all of the state territory. Very rich in rubber trees of the most valuable species (Hevea brasiliensis) and Brazil nut trees (Bertholletia excelsa), the forest guarantees that Acre is the greatest national producer of rubber and nuts. Acre's principal rivers, mostly navigable during the wet season (the Juruá, Tarauacá, Envira, Purús, Iaco, and Acre), cross the state with almost parallel courses which converge only outside of its territory.

The Amazon represents over half of the planet's remaining rainforests and comprises the largest and most species-rich tract of tropical rainforest in the world. Wet tropical forests are the most species-rich biome, and tropical forests in the Americas are consistently more species-rich than the wet forests in Africa and Asia. As the largest tract of tropical rainforest in the Americas, the Amazonian rainforests have unparalleled biodiversity. More than 1/3 of all species in the world live in the Amazon Rainforest.

Statistical and legal subdivisions
Acre is divided into twenty-two municipalities, five immediate regions and two intermediate regions:

Rio Branco
 Immediate Region of Brasileia
 
 Immediate Region of Rio Branco
 
 Microregion of Sena Madureira

Cruzeiro do Sul
 Immediate Region of Cruzeiro do Sul
 
 Immediate Region of Tarauacá

History

The region of present-day Acre is thought to have been inhabited by Pre-Columbian civilizations since at least 2,100 years ago. Evidence includes complex geoglyphs of this age found in the area. The natives who crafted them are believed to have had a relatively advanced knowledge of this technology. Since at least the early 15th century, the region has been inhabited by peoples who spoke Panoan languages; their territory was geographically close to that of the Inca.

In the mid-18th century, the region was colonized by the Spanish and became part of the Viceroyalty of Peru. Following the Peruvian and Bolivian wars of independence, which ended in 1826, the region and large portions around it became part of Bolivia, but independent of Spain. It was a territory of the short-lived Peru–Bolivian Confederation (1836–1839), until the two countries separated and the region returned to Bolivian control.

The discovery of rubber tree groves in the region in the mid-19th century attracted numerous immigrants, especially from Brazil and Europe, seeking to build on the rubber boom. Despite the increased numbers of Brazilians, the Treaty of Ayacucho (1867) determined that the region belonged to Bolivia. By 1877, Acre's population was composed almost entirely of Brazilians coming from the Northeast.

In 1899, Brazilian settlers from Acre created an independent state in the region called the Republic of Acre. Bolivians tried to gain control of the area, but Brazilians revolted and there were border confrontations. This resulted in what was known as the Acre War. On November 17, 1903, with the signing over and sale in the Treaty of Petrópolis, Brazil received final possession of the region. Acre was integrated into Brazil as a territory divided into three departments. The territory was acquired by Brazil for two million pounds sterling. The land was taken from Mato Grosso in accordance with terms for the construction of the Madeira-Mamoré railway.

Acre was united in 1920. On June 15, 1962, it was elevated to the category of state, and was the first to be governed by a woman, Iolanda Fleming, a teacher.

During the early twentieth century, rubber seedlings were taken to Southeast Asia, where competitive plantations were established, reducing the importance of the Amazon in production. But during the Second World War, Japanese forces took over the rubber tree groves of Malaya.

Acre was called on to produce rubber for the Allied war effort. The Rubber Soldiers, natives mostly of the Ceará plantation, increased production and provided critical supplies to the Allies.

Acre's decisive contribution to the Allied victory may have helped Brazil attract North American investment to form the National Steel Company (Companhia Siderúrgica Nacional) in the postwar era. This company aided in the industrialization of the Central-south, which did not yet possess basic heavy industries.

On April 4, 2008, Acre won a judicial debate with the state of Amazonas in relation to the dispute surrounding the Cunha Gomes Line. It annexed part of the municipalities of Envira, Guajará, Boca do Acre, Pauini, Eirunepé and Ipixuna.

Initial settlement

Since the 1970s, numerous geoglyphs, major geometric earthworks, have been discovered on deforested land in Acre, and dated to between 1–1250 AD. These are cited as evidence of complex Pre-Columbian societies. The BBC's Unnatural Histories explored studies of this area, concluding that the Amazon rainforest, rather than being a pristine "wilderness", has been shaped by man for at least 11,000 years. Traditional ancient practices included  forest gardening. Ondemar Dias is credited as the first to discover the geoglyphs in 1977. Alceu Ranzi expanded their findings by flying over Acre.

During the 17th century, Portuguese expeditions reached many of the far ends of present-day Brazil. The expansion of the exploration to the west followed, and they reached lands under control by the Spanish colonies. The two nations negotiated to establish their territories, under the Treaties of Madrid (1750) and San Ildefonso (1777). Both of the treaties were based on the explorations of Portuguese bandeirante Manoel Félix de Lima of the Guaporé and Madeira river basins. The treaties established the riverbeds of the Mamoré and Guaporé to their maximum western limits on the left bank of the Javari as the border between the Spanish and Portuguese territories.

The Portuguese created the new royal captaincy of Mato Grosso (1751), stimulating settlement toward the frontier. New centers developed: Vila Bela (1752) on the banks of the Guaporé, Vila Maria (1778) on the Paraguay River, and Casalvasco (1783). Until the mid-19th century, there was little effort to settle the area systematically. At that time, the great virgin source of rubber attracted commercial interest, and development followed.

The empire was directed towards agricultural exports, based on coffee as the most important commodity. The territories of the extreme west were unknown and usually overlooked. For example, although Cândido Mendes de Almeida's Atlas of the Empire of Brazil (1868), was considered a model of its time, geographers knew nothing of the Acre River and its principal tributaries, which did not appear at all in the atlas.

Some few armed bands of Brazilian explorers exploited the rural and unpopulated region, not knowing and little interested in whether they were "controlled" by Brazil, Peru, or Bolivia.

But the rubber boom of the mid-19th century, stimulated exploration by various expeditions to survey this resource and develop a plan for colonial settlement. At that time, João Rodrigues Cametá initiated the conquest of the Purús River; Manuel Urbano da Encarnação, an Indian with extensive knowledge of the region, reached the Acre River, traveling up it as far as the vicinity of the Xapuri; and João da Cunha Correia reached the drainage basin of the upper Tarauacá. For the most part, these expeditions took place on Bolivian land.

Exploitative activities, the industrial importance of the rubber reserves, and the penetration of Brazilian colonists in the region raised the attention of Bolivia, which solicited a better fixation of boundaries. After much failed negotiation, in 1867 the Treaty of Ayacucho was signed, which recognized the colonial uti possidetis, or use of that territory by Brazil. A border was established parallel to the confluence of the Beni and Mamoré rivers, running eastward to the headwaters of the Javari River, even though the source of this river was not yet known.

Northeast occupation
As the price of rubber rose in the market, the demand for it grew. The race to the Amazon increased. Plantations multiplied in the valleys of the Acre, Purús and, farther west, the Tarauacá. In the year 1873–1874, in the drainage basin of the Purús, the population rose from around one thousand to four thousand inhabitants. The Brazilian imperial government, already sensitive to the resulting offerings of rubber, considered the entire valley of the Purús to be Brazilian.

In the second half of the 19th century, disturbances were registered in the demographic and geo-economic balance of the empire. The coffee boom in the south attracted financial resources and workers, to detriment of the northeast. The growing impoverishment of that region stimulated migratory waves to the states of Rio de Janeiro, Minas Gerais, and São Paulo. The movement of population became particularly active during the prolonged drought of the northeastern interior, from 1877 to 1880. Hundreds of  Ceará indigenous people headed for the rubber plantations in search of work.

The Cearense migration reached the banks of the Juruá and accelerated the occupation of land which Bolivia would later reclaim. The great fluvial rivers and their tributary systems were full of small ship fleets  transporting colonists, goods, and supply material to the most isolated centers. The governments of Amazonas and Pará quickly established supply houses, which financed various types of operations, guaranteed credit, and promoted the commercial incentive of the rubber tree groves.

The rubber race had the frantic urgency of gold rushes of the 18th century. The situation drew the attention of the government to the economic use and development of an almost completely unknown area. The activities of private businesses would enable the government to incorporate the new region.

Land dispute
In 1890, José Manuel Pando, a Bolivian official, alerted his government to the fact that more than three hundred rubber plantations had been developed in the Jura basin, and most were occupied by Brazilians on what was nominally Bolivian territory. The Brazilian penetration had advanced west from the 64th meridian to beyond the 72nd, in an extension of one thousand kilometers, despite the borders having been established. The Treaty of 1867 limited Brazil to land above the confluence of the Beni and Mamoré rivers. 

In 1895 a new commission to define the borders was created. The Brazilian representative, Gregório Taumaturgo de Azevedo, resigned after verifying that the ratification of the Treaty of 1867 would harm the Brazilian rubber gatherers already settled in Bolivian territory.  In 1899, the Bolivians established an administrative post in Puerto Alonso, exacting taxes and customs duties upon Brazilian activities. The following year, Brazil accepted the sovereignty of Bolivia in the zone, when it officially recognized the old boundaries at the confluence of the Beni and Mamoré rivers.

Distant from the diplomatic process, the rubber workers judged their interests to have been cheated, and initiated insurrection movements. Some of this was in response to brutal treatment and abuse by forces managed by the major rubber companies. In the same year that Bolivia established administration in Puerto Alonso (1899), two serious uprisings occurred.

In April, a Cearense lawyer, José Carvalho, led an armed movement, which culminated in the expulsion of the Bolivian authorities. Shortly thereafter, Bolivia began negotiations with an Anglo-American trust, the Bolivian Syndicate, in order to promote, with exceptional force (exacting of taxes, armed force), the political and economic incorporation of Acre into its territory. The governor of Amazonas, Ramalho Júnior, informed of the agreement by a functionary of the Bolivian consulate in Belém, Luis Gálvez Rodríguez de Arias, sent military contingents forward to occupy Puerto Alonso. Gálvez proclaimed the independence of Acre, in the form of a republic. He became its president with the acquiescence of the rubber gatherers. Under protests from Bolivia, President Campos Sales abolished the ephemeral republic (March 1900).

Bolivians, reinstated in the region, suffered in 1900 from the assault of the so-called Floriano Peixoto expedition, or "expedition of the poets". It was made up of intellectual bohemians from Manaus. Following brief fighting in the area surrounding Puerto Alonso, the expedition was completely scattered.
Ultimately, the Bolivian government signed a contract with the Bolivian Syndicate (July 1901). The Brazilian congress, shocked by the arbitrariness of the act, took measures, canceling commercial accords and navigation between the two countries, and suspending the right of travel to Bolivia.

At the same time, Brazilians organized a large armed assault on the disputed area. The operations were led by a former student of the Military School of Rio Grande do Sul (Escola Militar do Rio Grande do Sul), José Plácido de Castro. The rubber gatherers occupied the village of Xapuri in Alto Acre (August 1902), and took  Bolivian officials into custody. Finally, Plácido de Castro's forces besieged Puerto Alonso, proclaiming the Independent State of Acre, after the capitulation of Bolivian troops (February 1903).

Diplomatic intervention

José Plácido de Castro was proclaimed governor of the new Independent State of Acre, and he had to discuss the question of borders in the diplomatic sphere. The Baron of Rio Branco, who had just assumed the role of Brazil's Minister of External Relations, immediately opened channels which were meant to have put an end to the question.

The simplest problem, with the Bolivian Syndicate, was resolved by Brazil paying one hundred and ten thousand pounds to renounce the contract (February 1903). Next, commercial relations were reestablished with Bolivia, while a part of the territory on the upper Purús and Juruá, militarily occupied in March 1903, was declared litigious.

Brazil committed to the construction of a Madeira-Mamoré Railway, connecting Porto Velho to Guajará-Mirim, at the confluence of the Beni and Madeira rivers. These actions were ratified in the Treaty of Petrópolis (November 17, 1903), through which Brazil acquired the future territory, now state of Acre.

Peru had also claimed sovereignty over the entire territory of Acre and part of the state of Amazonas, based on historic colonial titles. After armed conflicts between Brazilians and Peruvians on the upper Purús and Juruá, a joint administration was established in those regions (1904). The studies to determine the borders proceeded until the end of 1909, when a treaty was signed that completed the political integration of Acre into Brazilian territory.

Development from territory to statehood
Exercising a prominent role in national exports until 1913, when rubber was introduced to European and North American markets, Acre enjoyed a period of great prosperity. At the start of the 20th century, in a period of less than ten years, it grew to have more than 50,000 inhabitants.

From 1946 on, the federal government undertook actions to revive the economy of the Amazon Basin, and to include it in regional development projects.

Attending to the judicial arrangements of the Treaty of Petrópolis, President Rodrigues Alves sanctioned the law which created the Territory of Acre (1904), further dividing it into three departments: Alto Acre, Alto Purús, and Alto Juruá, the latter being separated to form Alto Tarauacá (1912). The departmental administration was exercised until 1921 by mayors appointed by the President of Brazil. At that time the arrangements were altered, passing the administration to a governor. The second Constitution of Brazil (1934) conceded to Acre the right to elect representatives to the National Congress of Brazil.

During the Estado Novo (New State) political ideas involving the valorization of the interior took hold, with the intention of promoting the articulation of more isolated areas. Thereafter, the vote of 1946 commended the channeling of budgetary resources from the Union to the Amazon, determining that the Territory of Acre would be elevated to the condition of state as soon as its revenue reached the equivalent of the lowest state tax exaction.

In the 1960s, the second cycle of efforts to accelerate the progress of the Amazon area was begun with the Superintendency of the Development of the Amazon (Superintendência do Desenvolvimento da Amazônia or SUDAM, 1966). Better networking of regional sub-sectors within the state was sought out, thus connecting the branch lines of the Transamazônica, which connected Rio Branco and Brasiléia, on the upper course of the Acre River, and Cruzeiro do Sul, on the banks of the Juruá, crossing the valleys of the Purús and the Tarauacá. Planning politics developed, therefore, destined to correct the demographic, economic, and political distortions of national integration.

Demographics

According to the IBGE of 2007, there were 664,000 people residing in the state. making Acre the third least populated state. The population density was 4.5 inh./km2.

Urbanization: 69.6% (2006); Population growth: 3.3% (1991–2000); Houses: 162,000 (2006).

The last PNAD (National Research for Sample of Domiciles) census revealed the following numbers: 441,000 Brown (Multiracial) people (66.5%), 172,000 White (26.0%), 45,000 Black (6.8%), 4,000 Asian or Amerindian people (0.7%).

Indigenous population
Acre is inhabited by various indigenous groups of the Panoan language family, including Kashinawa, Jaminawa and Xanenawa. There are also three groups of other language families, Madiha (Kulina) of the Arawan family as well as Yine (Manchineri) and Ashaninka (Kampa) of the Arawakan family.

Largest cities

Education
Portuguese is the official national language, and thus the primary language taught in schools. English and Spanish are also part of the official high school curriculum.

Educational institutions
 Universidade Federal do Acre (Ufac) (Federal University of Acre);
 Faculdade da Amazônia Ocidental (Faao) (College of Western Amazon);
 Faculdade de Ciências Jurídicas e Sociais Applicadas Rio Branco (Firb);
 Instituto de Educação, Ciência e Tecnologia do Vale do Juruá (Ieval);
 Instituto de Ensino Superior do Acre (Iesacre);
 União Educacional do Norte (Uninorte).

Economy

The service sector is the largest component of GDP at 66%, followed by the industrial sector at 28.1%. Agriculture represents 5.9%, of GDP (2004). Acre exports: wood 85.6%, poultry (chicken and wild turkey) 4.7%,  wood products 1.7% (2002).

Share of the Brazilian economy: 0.2% (2005).

Infrastructure

International airport 
 Rio Branco

Rio Branco International Airport is located in a rural zone of the municipality of Rio Branco, in the state of Acre. It was opened on November 2, 1999, with a unique characteristic: it moved 22 kilometers away from the previous airport site. Rio Branco Airport serves domestic and international flights (by scheduled carriers and air taxi firms) along with general and military aviation. The terminal can receive 270 thousand passengers a year and serves an average of 14 daily operations.

Cruzeiro do Sul
Cruzeiro do Sul International Airport is located 18 kilometers away from the city center, which helps access to the Alto Juruá region. It was opened on October 28, 1970, and absorbed by Infraero on March 31, 1980. The airport infrastructure was built in 1976 by the municipal government. In 1994 the runway was totally renovated.

Highways
 BR-364 (Rio Branco to Southeastern Brazil);
 BR-317 (Rio Branco to south of Acre);
 AC-040 (Rio Branco to Plácido de Castro);
 AC-401 (Plácido de Castro to Acrelândia);
 AC-010 (Rio Branco to Porto Acre).

Sports

Rio Branco provides visitors and residents with various sport activities.

Stadiums
 Arena da Floresta stadium;
 José de Melo stadium;
 Federação Acreana de Futebol stadium;
 Dom Giocondo Maria Grotti stadium;
 Adauto de Brito stadium;
 and many others.

The Arena da Floresta stadium in Rio Branco was one of the 18 candidates to host games in the 2014 FIFA World Cup, which was held in Brazil, but did not make it to the final 12 chosen.

Flag

The flag was adopted on March 15, 1921. It is a variation of the flags used by the secessionist state of Acre, with the yellow and green parts exchanged and mirrored. The yellow color symbolizes peace, green hope, and the star symbolizes the light which guided those who worked to make Acre a state of Brazil.

References

External links

 

 
States of Brazil

1962 establishments in Brazil
States and territories established in 1962